"Anything Could Happen" is a song by English singer Ellie Goulding from her second studio album, Halcyon (2012). It was released on 17 August 2012 as the album's lead single. Written and produced by Goulding and Jim Eliot of English electropop duo Kish Mauve, the song received positive reviews from music critics. "Anything Could Happen" peaked at number five on the UK Singles Chart. Outside the United Kingdom, "Anything Could Happen" peaked within the top ten of the charts in Poland, the top 20 of the charts in Australia, the Czech Republic Ireland and New Zealand and the top 50 of the charts in the United States.

The accompanying music video was directed by Floria Sigismondi and filmed in Malibu, California. The video depicts Goulding and her on-screen boyfriend getting into a car accident. "Anything Could Happen" was used in the Beats by Dre's #ShowYourColor campaign commercial and in the trailer for the second season of the HBO series Girls. The song has been covered by the Script, Fun and Fifth Harmony.

Background and composition
Goulding appeared on Fearne Cotton's BBC Radio 1 show on 9 August 2012 for the premiere of the song. She told Cotton, "I've been with this song a long time and I've had to listen to it a lot to get it just how I wanted it."

During a behind-the-scenes featurette for the "Anything Could Happen" music video, Goulding told MTV News, "I suppose it's one of those songs where I sort of talk about bits of my childhood, but also about my friendship with this person, and, um, I suppose it's a song of realization [...] And it's called 'Anything Could Happen,' [so] I'm hoping it will make people go out and propose to their girlfriends or go on that holiday they never ended up doing. I hope it will provoke positivity, as opposed to make people really sad."

"Anything Could Happen" is an electropop and synth-pop song. According to the sheet music published at Musicnotes by Sony/ATV Music Publishing, "Anything Could Happen" is written in the key of C major and has a moderate tempo of 103 beats per minute. Goulding's vocals span from G3 to E5 in the song.

Critical reception
"Anything Could Happen" received positive reviews from critics, with most praising the lyrical content and Goulding's vocals. Lewis Corner of Digital Spy gave "Anything Could Happen" four out of five stars, stating, "'After the war we said we'd fight together/ I guess we thought that's what humans do,' the electro-folk starlet serenades over a booming bass synth and choppy piano, before bursting into a sky-soaring chorus that manages to keep up with her haunting, high-pitched "ooohs". The result is a gothic love anthem that, truth be told, we'd happily see replace 'Puppy Love' at wedding receptions for years to come." Entertainment Weekly commented that with "Anything Could Happen", Goulding "strikes shimmery synth-pop gold again." Erin Thompson of the Seattle Weekly called the song "lovely" and "impactful", while commending Goulding for "writing songs that unfold like stories". "Anything Could Happen" was ranked number 84 by the Village Voices annual Pazz & Jop critics' poll.

Commercial performance
"Anything Could Happen" debuted at number five on the UK Singles Chart, selling 49,680 copies in its first week. The single stayed at number five the following week, selling 37,895 copies. As of August 2013, it had sold 326,836 copies in the UK.

In the United States, "Anything Could Happen" debuted at number 17 on the Bubbling Under Hot 100 Singles chart on the issue dated 8 September 2012, before rising to number three on 20 October upon its release to radio. The song entered the Billboard Hot 100 at number 75 for the week of 27 October 2012, peaking at number 47 in its tenth week on the chart. It also topped the Hot Dance Club Songs chart during the final week of 2012. The single was certified gold by the Recording Industry Association of America (RIAA) on 17 January 2013, and platinum on 24 July 2013. As of January 2014, the song had sold 1,166,000 copies in the US.

The song performed moderately elsewhere, reaching number two in Poland, number 16 in the Czech Republic, Ireland and New Zealand, number 20 in Australia, number 37 in Canada and number 66 in Germany.

Music video
The music video for "Anything Could Happen" was directed by Floria Sigismondi. In an interview with Carson Daly on his 97.1 AMP Radio show on 6 August 2012, Goulding stated that the video would be filmed the following day in Malibu, California. The video revolves around a couple's car crash near a Malibu beach. "I find myself on a rock, with no idea how I've been there", she told Fuse. "I've been in a car crash. I end up being a mermaid-type thing." She added, "I wanted to do a big video with big effects by the ocean [...] I wanted to do something really epic." Goulding declined offers of a stuntwoman to help her shoot the video, and instead performed her own stunts, such as being dropped onto a roof.

On 5 September, the "Anything Could Happen" video debuted via Goulding's YouTube channel. The video shows Goulding in a car with her on-screen boyfriend as they observe waves crashing on a beach. Goulding is then seen waking up on the beach, singing to the song, and walking around the beach finding silver floating spheres and triangled shaped mirrors. Goulding is also seen close up crying while singing and then bleeding out of her nose. The video continues to show Goulding and the on-screen boyfriend in a car crash, meeting up again in their "after life" on the beach. Later, Goulding is shown looking on to the car crash from above, while observing her blood-covered boyfriend, with a big fluffy pink ball holding her up by ropes. The video ends as Goulding floats away from the crash scene.

Lyric video
In late July 2012, Goulding invited fans via Facebook to contribute to a lyric video for "Anything Could Happen" by submitting photos related to the song's lyrics using Instagram. The lyric video premiered on Goulding's YouTube channel on 9 August 2012.

Ben & Ellie Edit
A second music video, titled the Ben & Ellie Edit, was released on Goulding's YouTube channel on 9 October 2012. This version all shot close up and cross fading into different scenes. The video begins with the text "Ellie Goulding", and flashes of a car driving and Goulding in multiple shots of her body. Once the song begins, Goulding starts singing, multiple shots of her being shown, close-up, side view, and bright lights, singing along.

Use in media and cover versions
Goulding is featured performing "Anything Could Happen" in the Beats by Dre commercial as part of their #ShowYourColor campaign, which debuted in September 2012, alongside the likes of Miami Heat player LeBron James and fellow Universal Music artists Lil Wayne and MGK.

The track was also used in the trailer for the second season of the HBO comedy-drama series Girls and in an episode of the Fox sitcom New Girl. It was also used in the trailer for the fourth season of the Network Ten comedy-drama series Offspring in Australia. The track was also used by TBS during the intro for game one of the 2012 ALDS between the Oakland Athletics and the Detroit Tigers. The song is also featured as the background music for the HTC Vive commercial, with Emily Blunt, Jennifer Garner, Michelle Yeoh and Juliette Lewis.

The song was covered in BBC Radio 1's Live Lounge by both Irish alternative rock band the Script and American indie pop band Fun on 27 November 2012 and 26 February 2013, respectively. In December 2012, the girl group Fifth Harmony performed "Anything Could Happen" in the semi-finals and finals on the second season of The X Factor (U.S.). Melissa Benoist, Jacob Artist and Kevin McHale covered the song in the fourteenth episode of the fourth season of the Fox series Glee, "I Do", aired 14 February 2013. Goulding joined Taylor Swift for a surprise performance of the song during Swift's Red Tour at Los Angeles' Staples Center on 23 August 2013. On 14 December 2013, Goulding performed "Anything Could Happen" on tenth series finale of The X Factor with finalist Luke Friend. The track has also been featured in the 2013 teen comedy film G.B.F.

Notable performances
On 30 September 2021, Goulding performed the song surrounded by floating cloud structures and white-clad dancers as part of the opening ceremony of Expo 2020 held under the fair's centerpiece, the Al Wasl Dome in Dubai, U.A.E.

Track listings

Credits and personnel
Credits adapted from the liner notes of Halcyon.

 Ellie Goulding – vocals, production
 Jim Eliot – production, drums, synths, piano, percussion, drum programming, sound effects
 London Community Gospel Choir – choir
 Sally Herbert – choir arrangement, choir conducting
 Graham Archer – choir recording engineering
 Joel M. Peters – choir recording engineering assistance
 Tom Elmhirst – mixing
 Ben Baptie – mixing assistance, additional engineering
 Naweed – mastering

Charts

Weekly charts

Year-end charts

Certifications

Release history

See also
 List of Billboard Dance Club Songs number ones of 2012

References

2012 singles
2012 songs
Ellie Goulding songs
Interscope Records singles
Music videos directed by Floria Sigismondi
Polydor Records singles
Songs written by Ellie Goulding
Songs written by Jim Eliot